Fort Lonesome is a rural area located in southeastern Hillsborough County, Florida, United States,  southeast of Tampa. A sawmill briefly revived the area with a few houses and three stores in the early 1930s. It was short-lived: a fire destroyed the mill and eventually the "town" disappeared. Today, it is mainly a farming region.



Geography
Fort Lonesome is located at 27.7 degrees north, 82.1 degrees west (27.705, -82.146). This location is the intersection of State Road 674 (Ruskin-Wimauma Rd) and County Road 39S, the site of a gas station and power substation.

Education
The community is served by Hillsborough County Schools.

See also

 List of ghost towns in Florida

References

External links

 Fort Lonesome profile from Hometown Locator

Former populated places in Florida
Former populated places in Hillsborough County, Florida